The 1924 United States House of Representatives elections were elections for the United States House of Representatives to elect members to serve in the 69th United States Congress. They were held for the most part on November 4, 1924, while Maine held theirs on September 8. They coincided with the election to a full term of President Calvin Coolidge, who had replaced Warren Harding following his death.

Coolidge's popularity helped his Republican Party to gain a net 22 seats from the opposition Democratic Party, cementing their majority. The burgeoning economy and Republican pro-business policies caused the party to gain popularity. An internal split somewhat reduced House gains, as a progressive faction of the party continued to antagonize party leadership. In the early stages of the election, there were fears that the Republicans would be swamped at the polls due to several scandals in the administration of President Warren Harding. However, after the chief executive's death, his incidents were painted as personal problems that did not reflect the state of the party. The populist Farmer–Labor Party also gained a seat in Minnesota.

Special elections

Overall results

Source: Election Statistics – Office of the Clerk

Alabama

Arizona

Arkansas

California

Colorado

Connecticut

Delaware

Florida

Georgia

Idaho

Illinois

Indiana

Iowa

Kansas

Kentucky

Louisiana

Maine

Maryland

Massachusetts

Michigan

Minnesota

Mississippi

Missouri

Montana

Nebraska

Nevada

New Hampshire

New Jersey

New Mexico

New York

North Carolina

North Dakota

Ohio

Oklahoma

Oregon

Pennsylvania

Rhode Island

South Carolina

South Dakota

Tennessee

Texas

Utah

Vermont

Virginia

Washington

West Virginia

Wisconsin

Wyoming

Non-voting delegates

Alaska Territory

See also
 1924 United States elections
 1924 United States presidential election
 1924 United States Senate elections
 68th United States Congress
 69th United States Congress

Notes

References

Footnotes